

Champions
World Series: Philadelphia Athletics over New York Giants (4-1)

Awards and honors
Chalmers Award
 Walter Johnson, Washington Senators, P
 Jake Daubert, Brooklyn Dodgers, 1B

MLB statistical leaders

1MLB Triple Crown Winner for Pitching

Major league baseball final standings

American League final standings

National League final standings

Events

January 8 - Frank Chance is named as the new manager of the New York Highlanders. However, Chance is never able to reproduce the success he had in Chicago as the manager of the Cubs, and he leaves New York going 117-168 during his tenure. 
February 17 – The Missouri Court of Appeals holds that a fan injured by a foul ball at a 1910 Kansas City Blues game was not entitled to damages from the team since he had chosen to sit in a seat unprotected by a screen when such seats were available, establishing the Baseball Rule in United States tort law.
April 9 – Ebbets Field opens.
June 14 - Ray Schalk hits his first career home one, off of Walter "Big Train" Johnson. 
October 11 – The Philadelphia Athletics defeat the New York Giants, 3-1, in Game 5 of the World Series to win the World Championship, four games to one. The Giants thus become the second club, following the Detroit Tigers of 1907–1909, to lose three consecutive World Series; and, to date, the last to do so.
November 2 – George Stovall, former St. Louis Browns player-manager, became the first Major Leaguer to jump to the outlaw Federal League after signing a contract to manage the Kansas City Packers.
December 3- Upset that the Brooklyn Dodgers will not give him a raise, Joe Tinker makes the jump to the Federal League. Tinker is named player/manager of the Chicago Whales for $12,000 in salary.

Births

January
January 7 – Johnny Mize
January 19 – Andy Pilney
January 20 – Jimmy Outlaw
January 21 – Fern Bell
January 27 – Stew Hofferth 	
January 27 – Floyd Speer
January 28 – Joe Kohlman

February
February 6 – Ken Weafer
February 7 – Mel Almada
February 9 – Tony Robello
February 10 – Bill Adair
February 11 – Jim Hayes
February 13 – Hack Miller
February 14 – Mel Allen
February 20 – Tommy Henrich

March
March 2 – Mort Cooper
March 4 – Bill Hart
March 16 – Ken O'Dea
March 21 – Bucky Jacobs
March 22 – Hank Steinbacher
March 25 – Buster Maynard
March 26 – Bill Zuber

April
April 1 – Buster Bray
April 10 – Lloyd Russell
April 14 – Jack Radtke
April 21 – Bert Hogg
April 24 – Herb Harris
April 25 – Woody Davis
April 26 – Packy Rogers

May
May 7 – Art Doll
May 10 – Al Rubeling
May 14 – Johnny Babich
May 14 – Howie Gorman
May 20 – Lou Scoffic
May 22 – Bill Lohrman
May 24 – Joe Abreu
May 27 – Hal Spindel

June
June 3 – Jim Sheehan
June 4 – Joe Holden
June 4 – Amby Murray
June 8 – Art Mahan
June 8 – Earl Reid
June 10 – Cal Dorsett
June 11 – Tom Baker
June 13 – Hal Luby
June 16 – Pete Coscarart
June 16 – Skeeter Scalzi
June 23 – Bill Cox
June 26 – Russ Lyon

July
July 1 – Frank Barrett
July 1 – Wedo Martini
July 12 – Tom Hafey
July 13 – Lee Handley
July 14 – Don Hendrickson
July 14 – Gene Schott
July 17 – Fred Williams
July 31 – Bill Fleming
July 31 – Joe Mulligan

August
August 5 – Fabian Gaffke
August 8 – Cecil Travis
August 9 – Jack Tighe
August 11 – Bob Scheffing
August 13 – Wes Flowers
August 16 – Tiny Bonham
August 16 – Lew Carpenter
August 17 – Rudy York
August 18 – Tommy Heath
August 20 – Eddie Popowski
August 25 – Sam Narron
August 25 – Bernie Snyder
August 26 – Hank Helf
August 31 – Mays Copeland
August 31 – Ray Dandridge

September
September 1 – Joe Marty
September 3 – Kerby Farrell
September 4 – Clarence Fieber
September 8 – Slick Castleman
September 9 – Hugh Mulcahy
September 13 – Booker McDaniels
September 13 – Roy Zimmerman
September 17 – Bob Uhl
September 18 – Max Marshall
September 19 – Nick Etten
September 23 – Pete Sivess
September 30 – Nate Andrews

October
October 3 – Dom Dallessandro
October 6 – Ken Chase
October 8 – Lee Rogers
October 11 – Silvio García
October 14 – Hugh Casey
October 18 – Roy Cullenbine
October 19 – Al Brazle
October 21 – Mark Christman
October 25 – Herb Bremer
October 25 – Gene Corbett
October 25 – Phil Marchildon
October 30 – Dave Barnhill
October 30 – John Burrows
October 31 – Warren Huston

November
November 4 – Joe Kracher
November 12 – Gene Lillard
November 15 – Lyle Judy
November 15 – Swede Larsen
November 17 – Lee Stine
November 18 – Charlie Fuchs
November 23 – Les Scarsella
November 24 – Walter Wilson
November 26 – Garton Del Savio
November 30 – Wally Holborow

December
December 2 – Glenn Crawford
December 6 – Bill Kerksieck
December 12 – Bill Webb
December 13 – Scat Metha
December 14 – Eddie Smith
December 21 – Heinie Heltzel
December 24 – George Jeffcoat
December 24 – Owen Scheetz
December 26 – Al Milnar
December 27 – Red Lynn

Deaths

January–March
January 6 – Jack Boyle, 46, catcher/first baseman who hit .253 with 23 home runs and 570 RBI for five different teams in three leagues from 1886 to 1898.
January 9 – George Crosby, 55, pitcher for the 1884 Chicago White Stockings of the National League.
January 14 – Hal O'Hagan, 43, first baseman for the 1892 Chicago Orphans and for the New York Giants, Cleveland Bronchos and Washington Senators in the 1902 season.
January 15 – Icicle Reeder, 55, outfielder who played in 1884 with the AA Cincinnati Red Stockings and the UA Washington Nationals.
January 16 – Tom Dolan, 58, catcher who hit .242 for five teams in three leagues between 1879 and 1888.
February 5 – George Frazier, 52, owner and manager of the 1890 Syracuse Stars of the then-major-league American Association.
February 9 – Joe Stewart, 33, pitcher for the Boston Beaneaters of the National League.
February 26 – Mike Drissel, 48, catcher in six games for the St. Louis Browns 1885 American Association champions.
March 3 – Jack Fee, 45, pitcher for the 1889 Indianapolis Hoosiers of the National League.
March 28 – Clare Patterson, 25, left fielder for the 1909 Cincinnati Reds of the National League.

April–June
April 16 – Jerry Harrington, 45, National League catcher who hit .227 in 189 games with the Cincinnati Reds (1890-'92) and Louisville Colonels (1893).
April 18 – Roscoe Miller, 36, pitcher for the Detroit Tigers (1901-'02), New York Giants (1902-'03) and Pittsburgh Pirates (1904), who became the first 20-game winner in Tigers history.
April 23 – Charlie Pabor, 66, player-manager for four teams of the National Association from 1871 through 1875.
 May 1 – Charlie Reynolds, 55, pitcher for the 1882 Philadelphia Athletics of the American Association.
May 13 – John O'Brien, 46, Canadian second baseman who hit .256 in 501 games for six National League teams from 1891 to 1899.
May 14 – Dennis Coughlin, 69, outfielder for the 1872 Washington Nationals of the National Association; best remembered as the only major leaguer who was wounded in combat during the Civil War.
May 18 – The Only Nolan, 55, pitcher who posted a 23-52 record and a 2.98 ERA in 79 games with four teams between 1878 and 1875.
May 18 – Charlie Robinson, 56, American Association catcher who played for the Indianapolis Hoosiers (1884) and Brooklyn Grays (1885).
June 5 – Chris von der Ahe, 61, owner of the St. Louis Browns from 1882 to 1898, who greatly developed the entertainment aspect of the sport with fan-friendly promotions and ballpark attractions, and also presided over first team to win four straight pennants (1885–1888).
June 13 – Eddie Quick, 31, pitcher for the 1903 New York Highlanders of the American League.
June 30 – George Tidden, 56, sports editor in New York since 1895.

July–September
July 13 – Dan Sweeney, 45, outfielder for the 1895 Louisville Colonels of the National League.
July 17 – Pat Scanlon, Canadian outfielder who played in 1884 with the Boston Reds of the Union Association.
July 19 – Jiggs Donahue, 34, a standout  at first base in the early years of the American League, and a key member of the 1906 White Sox that won their cross-town rival Cubs in the only all-Chicago World Series ever played.
July 28 – John Greenig, 65,  pitcher for the 1888 Washington Nationals of the National League.
August 8 – John Gaffney, 58, the sport's first great umpire, officiating for twelve seasons in three leagues between 1884 and 1900; managed Washington team in 1886-87, and officiated in 1887-88-89 championship series, pioneering use of multiple umpires in games.
August 14 – Chummy Gray, 40, pitcher who posted a 3-3 record and a 3.44 ERA for the Pittsburgh Pirates in 1899.
August 14 – William H. Locke, 43, co-owner of the Philadelphia Phillies from January 1913 until his death seven months later.
August 25 – Red Donahue, 40, pitcher who won 20 games three times with the Phillies and Browns and led the National League in complete games (1897), while collecting 164 career wins and a no-hitter (1898).
September 3 – Charlie Householder, 59, first baseman/catcher who played in two Major League seasons, 1882 and 1884.
September 15 – Frank Hough, 56, sports editor in Philadelphia who helped organize the Athletics American League franchise in 1901
September 24 – Fred Roat, 45, National League third baseman for the Pittsburgh Alleghenys (1890) and Chicago Colts (1892).

October–December
October 8 – Elmer Cleveland, 51, third baseman who hit .255 in 80 games with four clubs in three different leagues between 1884 and 1891.
October 13 – Mike Heydon, 39, catcher who played from 1898 through 1907 for the Senators, Cardinals, WhiteSox and Orioles.
October 24 – Dan Shannon, 48, player and manager during his three-year career with the Colonels/Giants/Statesmen/Athletics from 1889 to 1891.
November 15 – Monte McFarland, 41, pitcher who played for the National League Chicago Colts in 1895 and 1896.
December 24 – Chief Sockalexis, 42, right fielder for the 1897-99 Cleveland Spiders, who was the first Native American to play in the major leagues.
December 26 – Frank O'Connor, 46, pitcher for the 1893 Philadelphia Phillies.
December 30 – Joe Neale, 47, American Association pitcher for the St. Louis Browns (1886-'87) and Louisville Colonels (1890-'91).

References